The Forestier Peninsula is a peninsula located in south-east Tasmania, Australia, approximately  by the Arthur Highway, south-east of Hobart. At Eaglehawk Neck, the southern end of the Forestier Peninsula is connected to the Tasman Peninsula.

Location and features
The east coast of the peninsula, facing the Tasman Sea is contained within the Tasman National Park.

Bay whaling activities were conducted in the coves of the peninsula in the 1830s and 1840s.

The 200 convicts were involved in timber getting and land clearing. The station, beside the mouth of Flinders Creek, was short lived and closed within several years of establishment.

The peninsula was severely impacted by the 2013 Tasmanian bushfires with significant property damage, particularly in and around the hamlet of Murdunna.

A historical survey map is available which outlines the geology and vegetation of Tasman Peninsula, Forestier Peninsula and south east from Coal River

See also

 Geography of Tasmania

References

Further reading
 

 
East Coast Tasmania
Peninsulas of Tasmania
South East coast of Tasmania
Whaling stations in Australia